The Ice Hockey Association of Thailand (IHAT) is the governing body and member of the International Ice Hockey Federation (IIHF) that oversees ice hockey in Thailand.

References

External links
Official website
Thailand at IIHF.com

Thailand
Ice hockey in Thailand
Thailand
Sports governing bodies in Thailand
Sports organizations established in 1989
1989 establishments in Thailand